Grahn is an unincorporated community in Carter County, Kentucky, United States. It lies along Route 182, east of Olive Hill and southwest of the county seat of Grayson.  Its elevation is 692 feet (211 m). It has a post office with the ZIP code 41142.  The ZCTA for ZIP code 41142 had a population of 95 at the 2000 census.

A post office was established in the community in 1888 as Fireclay. In 1909, it was renamed Grahn in honor of the German immigrant Karl Bernhard Grahn, founder of a successful brickyard.

A school was constructed in Grahn in the 1930s under the direction of the WPA. This building was originally Grahn High School; later it became Grahn Elementary School. When the school was closed in 1994, residents of the area sought to purchase the building and renovate it into a community center. After a grant was received in 1997, the Grahn School Community Center opened to provide services for people in Grahn and the surrounding area, including a library, thrift store, sports facilities and computer classes.

Kirk Memorial Baptist Church is in Grahn and was established in 1889. It is the oldest Southern Baptist Church in the area. The church continues its operations during the Pandemic and the church survived in spite of the Lockdowns. It survived World War 1, World War 2, and Civil War; no wonder the Covid 19 Pandemic was overcome by the faithfulness of its members by Prayers, Unity and Faithfulness in Worships.

Kirk Memorial Baptist Church was without a Pastor since before the Covid 19 Pandemic;  when James Russel Schmidt their former Pastor had an accident which made him handicapped for Months. It's membership went down from between around 35 to 40 to just about 6 Seniors. 

Ely Roque Sagansay is presently the Pastor of the said church. Ely Roque Sagansay is the first Filipino- American to Minister in the Church since its founding. He accepted the Call after a Month of filling in the Pulpit for Preaching, with his wife Vemerlyn Dumala Sagansay as their Pianist. He first came to Preach at Kirk Memorial Baptist Church when he was invited by Roger Cline of Gideons International with the intention of endorsing him to the Church and Call him to be their Pastor.

References

Unincorporated communities in Carter County, Kentucky
Unincorporated communities in Kentucky